I Belong To You is the tenth single of the Dutch singer Caro Emerald, from the album The Shocking Miss Emerald.
'I Belong To You' was released in the Benelux on October 25, 2013. The single was released in Italy on November 8 and released in Switzerland on November 22. The single hasn't been released in the UK yet.  The video was filmed at Overtoun House in Milton, Dumbarton outside Glasgow, during a UK tour.

Track listing

Charts

References

Caro Emerald songs
2013 singles
Songs with music by Bert Kaempfert
Songs written by Carl Sigman
2013 songs
Songs written by David Schreurs
Songs with music by Herbert Rehbein
Songs written by Vincent DeGiorgio